The University of Santo Tomas in Manila, Philippines uses a system of academic dress at ceremonial occasions for its degree candidates/holders. The customs and styles are heavily influenced by the traditions of the Spanish universities. UST also follows the traditions and canon of a pontifical university.

When academic dress is worn
The full academic dress is worn during solemn investiture ceremonies and special occasions, such as, Misa de Apertura, or the Mass of the Holy Spirit, and on installation of a new rector.

Components of the regalia

Toga
UST uses a black long gown, otherwise known as a toga. It is worn over a formal suit, cassock, barong tagalog, or the college uniform.

Headwear
 Biretta - Birettas are used by doctorate and master's degree holders. The black birettas used by the doctors have a colored tuft or fringes corresponding to the college color or field of study. The black birettas used by the master's degree graduates lack fringes. The Ecclesiastical Faculties use a four or a three horned biretta that bears a colored pom. The Faculty of Medicine and Surgery uses an octagonal biretta with yellow fringes.

 Mortarboard - Bachelor's degree holders use a black square mortarboard with colored tassels that correspond to their college color.

Mozzetta
Mozzettas are used by the doctorate and master's degree holders. The color depends on the academic field. The graduates of business and management, in particular, uses yellow mozzetta.

Hood
Hoods are used by the bachelor's degree graduates. The color of the hood depends on the academic field. The Faculty of Pharmacy's academic color is purple, but a second color is added to the hood of its 2 programs. Light blue is added to the B.S. Biochemistry graduates, while yellow is added to the B.S. Medical Technology graduates.

Colors of the academic colleges
Each college in the university has a designated color. Some colleges follow the color system used in Spain. These are the "Faculties" (with the exemption of the Faculty of Engineering) and the College of Science. The Ecclesiastical faculties adapt the color system used in Pontifical universities. Graduates of doctor and master degrees use the color of the college associated with their academic field instead of the college colors of the Graduate School, which are gold, white, and blue. Below is a list of the college colors used of the university.

Student uniform

See also
 Academic Dress
 :es:Indumentaria universitaria en España

References

University of Santo Tomas
Santo Tomas